Feng Youmei (Chinese: 冯友梅) is a Chinese academic and university administrator currently serving as Chancellor of Duke Kunshan University. Feng previously served as Executive Vice President of Wuhan University and President of Tongji Medical University. Feng is among the few female university chancellors in China.

Feng's prior scholarship includes research in the geriatric disease and cancer fields, along with health system reform.

Selected works 

 The effect of neferine on foam cell formation by anti-low density lipoprotein oxidation Journal of Tongji Medical University, 1998

References 

Academic staff of Wuhan University
Living people
Chinese academics
1958 births